Eddy Merle Watson (February 8, 1949 – October 23, 1985) was an American folk and bluegrass guitarist. He was best known for his performances with his father, Doc Watson. Merle played and recorded albums together with his father from age 15 until his death in a tractor accident 21 years later. Merle was widely recognized as one of the best flat-picking and slide guitarists of his generation. MerleFest, one of the world's largest and most-prestigious folk music festivals, is held annually in Wilkesboro, NC and is named in his honor.

Merle and his father released a version of "Bottle of Wine" that reached No. 71 on the U.S. country chart.

Death 

Watson died in a farm accident in 1985 at age 36. He was driving a tractor to a nearby house when it slipped down an embankment and pinned him beneath it.

Discography
All albums were in collaboration with his father, Doc Watson. 
1965 – Doc Watson & Son
1967 – Ballads from Deep Gap
1971 – Doc Watson on Stage
1972 – The Elementary Doctor Watson!
1973 – Then and Now
1974 – Two Days in November
1976 – Doc and the Boys
1977 – Lonesome Road
1978 – Look Away!
1981 – Red Rocking Chair
1983 – Doc and Merle Watson's Guitar Album
1984 – Down South
1985 – Pickin' the Blues

Awards and honors
1974 Grammy for Best Ethnic Or Traditional Recording: Merle Watson & Doc Watson for Two Days In November
1979 Grammy for Best Country Instrumental Performance: Doc Watson & Merle Watson for Big Sandy/Leather Britches
"Best Finger Picking Guitarist-Folk/Blues or Country" Award from Frets Magazine

References

1949 births
1985 deaths
Accidental deaths in North Carolina
American folk singers
Bluegrass musicians from North Carolina
Farming accident deaths
Grammy Award winners
Singers from North Carolina
20th-century American singers
20th-century American guitarists
Guitarists from North Carolina
American male guitarists
People from Lenoir, North Carolina
People from Deep Gap, North Carolina
Country musicians from North Carolina
20th-century American male singers
Flying Fish Records artists